Robert Griffin was an American Negro league pitcher in the 1930s.

Griffin played for the Chicago American Giants in 1931. In three recorded appearances on the mound, he posted an 8.25 ERA over 12 innings.

References

External links
 and Seamheads

Year of birth missing
Year of death missing
Place of birth missing
Place of death missing
Chicago American Giants players